The Par force hunting landscape in North Zealand is a collection of hunting grounds and forests north of Copenhagen. The landscape was submitted for admission to the UNESCO List of World Heritage Sites on 1 August 2010 and was inscribed on 4 July 2015. The landscape comprises three main areas: Store Dyrehave, Gribskov and Jægersborg Dyrehave/Jægersborg Hegn, and contains the most significant hunting grounds for the medieval nobility in Denmark. The central-star grid design of the landscape, with numbered roads and stone posts, fences, demonstrates the unique planning and design of hunting landscapes in the 17th and 18th centuries.

Location
The three forests are all located in the North Zealand peninsula to the north of Copenhagen. Jægersborg Dyrehave with the fenced Jægersborg Hegn is closest to the capital on the peninsula's east coast. The square-shaped Store Dyrehave is located further to the north in the centre of the peninsula while Gribskov, further north still, is adjacent to Esrum Sø. Store Dyrehave and Gribskov are not far from Frederiksborg Palace and the town of Hillerød

Background
 

The forests and related buildings in three locations to the north of Copenhagen formed parts of a well-preserved Baroque hunting landscape designed in the late 17th and early 18th centuries for the Danish monarchs to participate in par force hunting. The history of the area for hunting dates back to the Middle Ages when the Danish kings, the church and noblemen had estates and hunting grounds in the peninsula's hilly forests and undulating farmlands. In connection with the Danish Reformation, in 1536 King Frederick II confiscated the estates belonging to the Catholic Church. From 1560, the various estates were merged in order to establish an extensive royal hunting park across the North Zealand peninsula. It was, however King Christian V who, from 1670, put his army to work on creating a par force deer park around Ibstrup Castle. In his youth, the king had experienced par force hunting in France's forest of Saint-Germain-en-Laye. He then imported hounds and huntsmen from England, renaming the castle Jægersborg (hunter's castle) and the estate Jægersborg Dyrehave (Jægersborg deer park).

One of the most important aspects of the par force hunt was that it provided a basis for demonstrating the absolute power of the monarch by developing connecting roads across the landscape. The entire North Zealand peninsula area was patterned with a Cartesian-based road system consisting of stars surrounded by distinct squares. Stone posts indicated whether roads led towards or away from the centre of the star. The mathematical approach reinforced the king's image as a representative of reason in line with Baroque ideals. The Danish orthogonal geometry of the road systems was an improvement on the star-shaped grids used in France and Germany as it provided equal access to all parts of the forest.

The Jægersborg hunting park contained no star-shaped road networks but was instead based on the presence of a royal hunting lodge, initially known as the Hermitage or Hubertus House.

Danish Museum of Hunting and Forestry
Much of the preparatory work on the UNESCO nomination was undertaken by Jette Baagøe, director of the Danish Museum of Hunting and Forestry in Hørsholm and chair of the steering group which has worked on the nomination since 2010. The museum is expected to be the site manager and principal coordinator of information and news about the Par Force heritage site. On the basis of the significant increase in visitors to Stevns Museum resulting from the inclusion of Stevns Klint as a UNESCO heritage site in 2014, Baagøe expects more visitors to the museums of North Zealand, especially to the Museum of Hunting and Forestry where a special exhibition will be devoted to the Par Force Hunting Landscape in October 2015.

See also
 Danish Museum of Hunting and Forestry
 Kongernes Nordsjælland

References

External links 
 The official site for the UNESCO par force hunting landscape in North Zealand
 UNESCO (2015): The par force hunting landscape in North Zealand, admission and full description.
 UNESCO (2010): The Parforce Hunting landscape in North Zealand, submission and arguments.
 Source about the hunting dogs
 Historic images

World Heritage Sites in Denmark
Forests of Denmark
Deer hunting
Hunting in Denmark
Tourist attractions in the Capital Region of Denmark